Elizabeth Wilmot may refer to:

 Elizabeth Montgomery (designer), married name Elizabeth Wilmot (1902–1993), English theatre and opera costume and scenic designer
 Elizabeth Wilmot, Countess of Rochester (1651–1681), English heiress